Phlaocyon achoros is an extinct species of the genus Phlaocyon, belonging to the subfamily Borophaginae and tribe Phlaocyonini, a canid which inhabited the southeastern North America from the Late Oligocene to Miocene living 24.6—20.8 mya and existed for approximately .

Taxonomy
Its type locality is Buda Mine, which is in a Harrisonian sinkhole horizon in Florida.

Morphology

Body mass
 estimated the body mass of two specimens to be .

Fossil distribution
Only known from Buda Mine Site, Alachua County, Florida ~24.8—20.6 Ma.

References

Notes

Sources

 
 
 
Martin, L.D. 1989. Fossil history of the terrestrial carnivora. Pages 536 - 568 in J.L. Gittleman, editor. Carnivore Behavior, Ecology, and Evolution, Vol. 1. Comstock Publishing Associates: Ithaca.
 

Borophagines
Oligocene canids
Miocene canids
Miocene species extinctions
Oligocene species first appearances